Tridrepana fulvata is a moth in the family Drepanidae. It was described by Snellen in 1876. It is found in China, India, Myanmar, Malaysia and Indonesia.

The wingspan is 30–38 mm for males and 32.5–45 mm for females.

The larvae feed on Nephelium species.

Subspecies
Tridrepana fulvata fulvata
Tridrepana fulvata brevis Watson, 1957 (India, Myanmar, China: Shanghai, Fujian, Guangdong, Hainan, Hong Kong, Yunnan)
Tridrepana fulvata celebica Watson, 1961 (Sulawesi)

References

Moths described in 1876
Drepaninae